Ridgeland is a village in Dunn County, Wisconsin, United States. The population was 273 at the 2010 census.

Geography
Ridgeland is located at  (45.204183, -91.897478).

Demographics

2010 census
As of the census of 2010, there were 273 people, 127 households, and 72 families living in the village. The racial makeup of the village was 97.4% White, 0.7% Asian, and 1.8% from two or more races.

There were 127 households, of which 28.3% had children under the age of 18 living with them, 44.9% were married couples living together, 7.1% had a female householder with no husband present, 4.7% had a male householder with no wife present, and 43.3% were non-families. 38.6% of all households were made up of individuals, and 19.7% had someone living alone who was 65 years of age or older. The average household size was 2.15 and the average family size was 2.85.

The median age in the village was 42.1 years. 23.4% of residents were under the age of 18; 4.8% were between the ages of 18 and 24; 25.4% were from 25 to 44; 23.8% were from 45 to 64; and 22.7% were 65 years of age or older. The gender makeup of the village was 49.1% male and 50.9% female.

2000 census
As of the census of 2000, there were 265 people, 123 households, and 70 families living in the village. The population density was 625.0 people per square mile (243.6/km2). There were 131 housing units at an average density of 309.0 per square mile (120.4/km2). The racial makeup of the village was 99.25% White, 0.38% from other races, and 0.38% from two or more races. Hispanic or Latino of any race were 0.38% of the population.

There were 123 households, out of which 27.6% had children under the age of 18 living with them, 46.3% were married couples living together, 8.9% had a female householder with no husband present, and 42.3% were non-families. 41.5% of all households were made up of individuals, and 26.0% had someone living alone who was 65 years of age or older. The average household size was 2.15 and the average family size was 2.93.

In the village, the population was spread out, with 26.8% under the age of 18, 3.8% from 18 to 24, 23.0% from 25 to 44, 17.0% from 45 to 64, and 29.4% who were 65 years of age or older. The median age was 40 years. For every 100 females, there were 84.0 males. For every 100 females age 18 and over, there were 78.0 males.

The median income for a household in the village was $25,000, and the median income for a family was $36,875. Males had a median income of $24,844 versus $21,125 for females. The per capita income for the village was $13,257. About 12.5% of families and 15.8% of the population were below the poverty line, including 17.6% of those under the age of eighteen and 26.0% of those 65 or over.

Town name
The name Ridgeland was given because of wooded ridges which surround it. It was first a model community built to accommodate rail workers. The community of Annesburg was located 1/2 - 1 mile north.<local historian>

References

Villages in Dunn County, Wisconsin
Villages in Wisconsin